Sylvias hälsning från Sicilien (Swedish, Sylvia's Greeting from Sicily) is a poem by Zachris Topelius from 1853, which was composed to a christmas carol by Karl Collan. The poem has been translated to Finnish by both Elina Vaara and Martti Korpilahti, and the latter one from 1918 is one of the most beloved Finnish christmas carols. It has been chosen as the best Finnish christmas carol in the 1960s and again in 2002 in a poll by Yleisradio. The poem is a part of the collection Sylvian laulut:

Sylvia, or Eurasian blackcap, (Sylvia atricapilla), is a migratory bird which hibernates in Sicily. The poem tells about the wonders of the South, like Cypresses and Mount Etna, but it also tells about homesickness and patriotism.

The cage mentioned in the first verse refers to a cruel way of catching birds: The bird is trapped into a cage with its eyes pierced, and as a night singer it will attract other birds, who will fly straight to the catcher's net. Topelius opposed this harsh way of netting.

The cage reference is also said to depict Finland as an autonomic but oppressed part of Russia.

Lyrics of the carol

See also

List of Christmas carols
Varpunen Jouluaamuna
Joulupuu on rakennettu

References

Christmas carols
Finnish songs